Smaltz Building, also known as the Smaltz-Goodwin Building, is a historic factory building located in the Callowhill neighborhood of Philadelphia, Pennsylvania.  It was built in 1911, and is a 10-story, 11 bay by five bay, reinforced concrete building.  It originally housed the Smaltz-Goodwin women's shoe manufacturer until 1933, then a variety of clothing manufacturers.

It was added to the National Register of Historic Places in 2005.  It is a contributing property to the Callowhill Industrial Historic District.

Between 2012 and 2016 the Post Brothers development company rehabbed the Smaltz Building into the first LEED Gold certified residential high-rise in Philadelphia, opening the building as The Goldtex apartment community in January 2016.

References

External links 

 Goldtex Apartments
 Post Brothers | Apartments in Philadelphia

Industrial buildings and structures on the National Register of Historic Places in Philadelphia
Industrial buildings completed in 1911
Historic district contributing properties in Pennsylvania
Callowhill, Philadelphia
1911 establishments in Pennsylvania
Shoe factories